The 2018 Copa Libertadores Finals was the two-legged final to decide the winners of the 2018 Copa Libertadores, the 59th edition of the Copa Libertadores, South America's premier international club football tournament organised by CONMEBOL.

The finals were contested in a two-legged home-and-away format between Argentine clubs Boca Juniors and River Plate, making it the first Superclásico final of an international competition. The first leg was hosted by Boca Juniors at the Estadio Alberto J. Armando in Buenos Aires, Argentina, on 11 November 2018, while the second leg took place outside South America at the Santiago Bernabéu in Madrid, Spain (a neutral venue) on 9 December 2018. This was the last final to take place over two legs, as starting from 2019 the final would be played as a single match at a venue chosen in advance.

The second leg was originally to be hosted by River Plate at the Estadio Monumental Antonio Vespucio Liberti in Buenos Aires, Argentina, on 24 November 2018. However, due to safety concerns arising from an attack on the Boca Juniors team bus prior to the match, the second leg was moved outside of Argentina and South America, later confirmed to be the Santiago Bernabéu in Madrid, Spain. This was the first time that the second leg of the Copa Libertadores final has been held outside of South America, and the first final held outside of the Americas.

River Plate won the final 5–3 on aggregate for their fourth Copa Libertadores title. As winners, they qualified as the CONMEBOL representative at the 2018 FIFA Club World Cup in the United Arab Emirates, entering in the semi-finals. They also earned the right to play against the winners of the 2018 Copa Sudamericana in the 2019 Recopa Sudamericana. River Plate also automatically qualified for the group stage of the 2019 Copa Libertadores.

Due to the intense rivalry between Boca and River, the match was referred to as the "Superfinal", and "the Final to end all Finals". The press called it the "most important final in Argentina's football history". According to Richard Martin, a Reuters reporter, River's win "guarantees them bragging rights over their neighbours for many years to come".

Teams

For the third time, two teams from the same country faced each other in the final, after Brazilian teams met in the 2005 and 2006 finals. It was the first all-Argentine final of the Copa Libertadores, as well as the first final to feature two teams from the same city. 
The 2018 finals marked the first time that the Superclásico was contested in the Copa Libertadores final (or any final of an international competition), and the third time that the two clubs have met in a final, after the 1976 Nacional championship final and the 2017 Supercopa Argentina.

Their most recent meeting in the Copa Libertadores had been in the 2015 round of 16, where Boca Juniors were disqualified and the tie awarded to River Plate, after River Plate players were attacked in la Bombonera stadium with pepper spray by Boca Juniors fans as they emerged for the second half of the second leg, with River leading on aggregate 1–0.

Venues

Road to the final

Note: In all results below, the score of the finalist is given first (H: home; A: away).

Format
The final was to be played on a home-and-away two-legged basis, with the higher-seeded team (River Plate) hosting the second leg. The away goals rule was not applied, and extra time would be played if the aggregate score was tied after the second leg. If the aggregate score was still tied after extra time, a penalty shoot-out would have been used to determine the winner. If extra time was played, a fourth substitution would have been allowed.

Matches

First leg

Summary
The first leg of the final was originally scheduled for 7 November, with the second leg on 28 November 2018 (both on Wednesdays). However, after the finalists were known, CONMEBOL adjusted the dates, with the first leg (hosted by Boca Juniors, the lower seed) on 10 November and the second leg (hosted by River Plate, the higher seed) on 24 November (both Saturdays at 16:00 local time). The Argentine Football Association opposed the date change. Following discussion, the final was moved to 17:00 local time. The first leg was postponed less than two hours before kickoff due to Boca Junior's pitch at the Estadio Alberto J. Armando being waterlogged due to local flooding. The match was rescheduled for the following day, 11 November, with the kickoff moved to 16:00 local time. The game was goalless until the 34th minute mark, when Ramón Ábila put Boca ahead, only for Lucas Pratto to equalise 90 seconds later. Dario Benedetto then restored Boca's lead, to make the score 2–1 at half-time.  However, the game was to end all square at 2–2 after Carlos Izquierdoz scored an own goal for River plate in the 61st minute.

Details

Second leg

Violence and change of venue

Prior to the second leg of the final on 24 November, the Boca Juniors team bus was attacked en route to River Plate's stadium, the Estadio Monumental Antonio Vespucio Liberti. Multiple windows were broken by projectiles thrown from a crowd surrounding the bus, allowing pepper spray to enter the cabin. Several players were injured as a result of the broken glass and pepper spray, with the match delayed by one hour to 18:00 local time. Kickoff was later moved to 18:20 local time, and again to 19:15, before once more being delayed until 19:30. Following the delays, the match was rescheduled for the following day, 25 November, with the same kickoff, 17:00 local time. Former Boca Juniors and River Plate striker Gabriel Batistuta called the attacks "shameful".

On 25 November, prior to the rescheduled second leg, Boca Juniors requested that the match be postponed in order for it to be played in "conditions of equality." CONMEBOL postponed the match once more as Boca's requirements could not guaranteed. On 27 November, CONMEBOL confirmed the second leg would be played outside Argentina due to safety concerns, with the match taking place on 8 or 9 December. Subsequently, on 29 November, CONMEBOL confirmed the match would take place at the Santiago Bernabéu in Madrid, Spain, on 9 December at 20:30 local time.

For security reasons, prior to the first leg, both clubs unanimously agreed to prohibit away fans from attending either match. However, following the decision by CONMEBOL to move the second leg to Madrid, these plans were altered, with 5,000 tickets allocated to each club. Additionally, River Plate were reprimanded for the bus attack, fined $400,000, and ordered to play two games behind closed doors in the Estadio Monumental. Real Madrid sold 25,000 tickets to fans of each team, as over 250,000 Argentines live and work in Spain, including the Real Madrid manager at the time, Santiago Solari, a former River Plate midfielder. Real also agreed to sell tickets to their season ticket holders, which sold out quickly. Security responsibilities for the second leg were delegated to the Spanish football federation, rather than CONMEBOL, with Prime Minister Pedro Sánchez saying that plans were underway to have the "necessary deployments to ensure the event is secure".

However, additional concerns were reputedly raised by both clubs following the decision to move the game to Madrid. Leonardo Ponzio, the River Plate captain, was allegedly involved in a match-fixing scandal during his time at Real Zaragoza, and as such his eligibility to play football in Spain was unclear at the time. There were also reports that Boca Juniors intended to appeal the decision to relocate the second leg. In a subsequent press release, River Plate also announced an intent to protest the CONMEBOL decision to play in Madrid. Boca Juniors appealed to the Court of Arbitration for Sport to have the second leg postponed, but was rejected, although the court would continue to consider whether River should be suspended.

Summary
The second leg finally went ahead in front of a crowd of approximately 72,000 in the Bernabéu. Most of the early opportunities fell to Boca, and finally Dario Benedetto, who had also scored in the first leg, scored in the 44th minute to give Boca a half-time lead. In the second half, River Plate fought back and finally equalised after another first-leg scorer, Lucas Pratto, scored in the 68th minute. The match then went to extra time, during which Boca were reduced to 10 men after Wilmar Barrios was sent off.  River Plate took advantage, with Juan Quintero putting them into the lead in the 109th minute. An injury to Fernando Gago in the 116th minute, left Boca to just 9 men having used all substitutions. In the final minute Leonardo Jara hit the post for Boca, only for River Plate to break upfield and make the final score 3–1, with Pity Martínez shooting into an empty net. "It's been almost 60 days since this started and there is tremendous sadness," said the Boca manager, Guillermo Barros Schelotto.

Details

See also
2018 Copa Sudamericana Finals

Notes

References

External links
 CONMEBOL Libertadores 2018, CONMEBOL.com 

2018
Finals
November 2018 sports events in South America
December 2018 sports events in Europe
l
l
2018 in Argentine football
2018–19 in Spanish football
2018
2018
2010s in Buenos Aires
2018 in Madrid
International club association football competitions hosted by Argentina
International club association football competitions hosted by Spain
Argentine football clubs in international competitions